The 2011 Montgomery mayoral election took place on August 23, 2011, to elect the Mayor of Montgomery, Alabama. It saw the reelection of incumbent mayor Todd Strange.

The election was officially nonpartisan. Had no candidate received a majority of the vote, a runoff election would have been held between the top two candidates.

Results

References

Mayoral elections in Montgomery, Alabama
Montgomery
Montgomery